The School of Applied Sciences (Portuguese: Faculdade de Ciências Aplicadas, FCA) is an academic unit of the State University of Campinas, one of the most respected universities in Latin America.

Its campus is located in the city of Limeira, which is 55 km from the main UNICAMP campus in Campinas, both located in the state of São Paulo. Established in 2009, it is the most recent unit of UNICAMP. The differential of FCA in relation to the other units of UNICAMP is its philosophy based on expanded interdisciplinary and coexistence among students of various fields of knowledge.

Offered Courses

Currently, FCA offers courses in:

 Manufacturing Engineering
 Industrial Engineering
 Business Management
 Management of International Business
 Agribusiness Management
 Management of Public Policies
 Nutrition
 Sports Sciences

External links
 Faculdade de Ciências Aplicadas Website.

University of Campinas